9th Online Film Critics Society Awards
January 16, 2006

Best Film: 
 A History of Violence  
The 9th Online Film Critics Society Awards, honoring the best in film for 2005, were given on 16 January 2006.

Winners and nominees

Best Picture
A History of Violence
Brokeback Mountain
Crash
Good Night, and Good Luck.
Munich

Best Director
David Cronenberg – A History of Violence
George Clooney – Good Night, and Good Luck.
Peter Jackson – King Kong
Ang Lee – Brokeback Mountain
Steven Spielberg – Munich

Best Actor
Philip Seymour Hoffman – Capote 
Terrence Howard – Hustle & Flow
Heath Ledger – Brokeback Mountain
Joaquin Phoenix – Walk the Line
David Strathairn – Good Night, and Good Luck.

Best Actress
Reese Witherspoon – Walk the Line 
Joan Allen – The Upside of Anger
Felicity Huffman – Transamerica
Keira Knightley – Pride & Prejudice
Naomi Watts – King Kong

Best Supporting Actor
Mickey Rourke – Sin City 
Matt Dillon – Crash
Paul Giamatti – Cinderella Man
Jake Gyllenhaal – Brokeback Mountain
William Hurt – A History of Violence

Best Supporting Actress
Maria Bello – A History of Violence
Amy Adams – Junebug
Catherine Keener – Capote
Rachel Weisz – The Constant Gardener
Michelle Williams – Brokeback Mountain

Best Original Screenplay
Good Night, and Good Luck. – George Clooney and Grant HeslovBroken Flowers – Jim Jarmusch
Crash – Paul Haggis and Bobby Moresco
Match Point – Woody Allen
The Squid and the Whale – Noah Baumbach

Best Adapted ScreenplayBrokeback Mountain – Larry McMurtry and Diana OssanaCapote – Dan Futterman
The Constant Gardener – Jeffrey Caine
A History of Violence – Josh Olson
Munich – Tony Kushner and Eric Roth

Best Foreign Language FilmDownfall
2046
Caché
Kung Fu Hustle
Oldboy

Best Documentary
Grizzly Man
The Aristocrats
Enron: The Smartest Guys in the Room
March of the Penguins
Murderball

Best Animated Feature
Wallace & Gromit: The Curse of the Were-Rabbit
Corpse Bride
Howl's Moving Castle
Madagascar
Robots

Best Cinematography
Sin City – Robert Rodriguez2046 – Christopher Doyle, Pung-Leung Kwan and Lai Yiu-fai
Brokeback Mountain – Rodrigo Prieto
Good Night, and Good Luck. – Robert Elswit
The New World – Emmanuel Lubezki

Best EditingSin City – Robert RodriguezThe Constant Gardener – Claire Simpson
Good Night, and Good Luck. – Stephen Mirrione
A History of Violence – Ronald Sanders
Munich – Michael Kahn

Best ScoreBrokeback Mountain – Gustavo SantaolallaBatman Begins – James Newton Howard and Hans Zimmer
King Kong – James Newton Howard
Munich – John Williams
The New World – James Horner

Breakthrough FilmmakerPaul Haggis – Crash
Judd Apatow – The 40-Year-Old Virgin
Craig Brewer – Hustle & Flow
Bennett Miller – Capote
Joe Wright – Pride & Prejudice

Breakthrough Performer
Owen Kline – The Squid and the Whale
Nathan Fillion – Serenity
Georgie Henley – The Chronicles of Narnia: The Lion, the Witch and the Wardrobe
Tony Jaa – Ong-Bak: The Thai Warrior
Q'orianka Kilcher – The New World

References 

2005
2005 film awards